Good to Go is an album by the American hardcore punk band 7 Seconds, released in 1999. It was their first release on SideOneDummy Records.

Critical reception
AllMusic's Steve Huey wrote that "Good to Go isn't a revolutionary hardcore punk record, just one that's extremely well done." The Sacramento Bee thought that the album "harkens back to classic hard-core punk," writing that "'Sooner or Later', the album's opening track, features an anthemlike chorus and pogo-inspiring energy."

Album Tracks
All songs written by Kevin Seconds, except for where noted.
 "Sooner or Later" – 1:09
 "Sour Grapes" – 1:19
 "One Big Guessing Game" (Seconds, Steve Youth) – 1:51
 "Best Friend" – 2:00
 "Slow Down a Second" – 2:05
 "Safety Net" – 1:22
 "Change the Key" – 1:57
 "4, 1, 4, 1, Done" – 0:28
 "Message from a Friend" (Seconds, Youth) – 1:19
 "True Roots Show" – 2:03
 "This World of Mine" – 1:42
 "You See the Flaws" – 2:04
 "I See You Found Another Trophy" (Bob Adams, Seconds) – 1:46
 "Good to Go" – 1:02
 "Never Try" – 1:46
 "Here We Go Again Kids" – 2:55

Personnel
Kevin Seconds: Lead Vocals 
Bob Adams: Guitar, Vocals 
Troy Mowat: Drums 
Steve Youth: Bass, Piano

References

1999 albums
7 Seconds (band) albums
SideOneDummy Records albums